Mallinus is a genus of spiders in the family Zodariidae. It was first described in 1893 by Simon. , it contains only 1 African species.

References

Zodariidae
Araneomorphae genera
Spiders of Africa